Thomas Kevin Clancy (born 1952) is an American legal educator and lawyer. He is a professor emeritus at the University of Mississippi School of Law and lectures nationally on cyber crime and the Fourth Amendment, which regulates governmental searches and seizures.  He previously served as the Director of the National Center for Justice and the Rule of Law at the University of Mississippi School of Law, where he was a Research Professor.  He took emeritus status on July 1, 2014.  Clancy received his B.A. from the University of Notre Dame, and is a graduate of Vermont Law School.

Before teaching at the University of Mississippi School of Law he was a member of the adjunct faculties at the University of Baltimore School of Law from 1998 to 2001 and the University of Maryland Francis King Carey School of Law from 1993 to 2001. He was a visiting professor at the William S. Richardson School of Law in the summers of 2003 and 2007. In the spring of 1995 he was a visiting professor at Vermont Law School. From 1983 to 1985 he was a member of the adjunct faculty at the American University, Washington College of Law. From 1980 to 1981 he was a legal writing instructor at Vermont Law School.

From 1981 to 1982 he practiced law with the Legal Services Corporation. From 1982 to 1988 he was in private practice in Washington, DC. From 1988 to 1999 he was an Assistant Attorney General for the Criminal Appeals Division in the Office of the Attorney General of Maryland. From 1999 to 2001 he was chief of the Post Conviction Unit within the State’s Attorney’s Office for Prince George's County, Maryland.

Clancy's publications focus on the history, structure, and purpose of the Fourth Amendment, including the acquisition by the government of digital evidence. Works by Clancy include Cyber Crime and Digital Evidence: Materials and Cases, LexisNexis 2011, .  A second edition of that book was published in December, 2014.  .  He has also published a treatise on search and seizure entitled The Fourth Amendment: Its History and Interpretation, Carolina Academic Press 2008, .  A second edition of "The Fourth Amendment:  Its History and Interpretation" was published in January, 2014.  .  His many law review articles on the Fourth Amendment are available at:  http://ssrn.com/author=509497

References

1952 births
University of Mississippi faculty
Vermont Law and Graduate School faculty
Washington College of Law faculty
University System of Maryland faculty
University of Baltimore faculty
William S. Richardson School of Law faculty
20th-century American lawyers
21st-century American lawyers
20th-century American educators
21st-century American educators
Legal educators
Living people
University of Notre Dame alumni
Vermont Law and Graduate School alumni